Wilfried Feichtinger  (19 October 1950 – 3 June 2021) was an Austrian gynecologist specializing in artificial insemination. Feichtinger died on 3 June 2021, aged 70.

References

1950 births
2021 deaths
Austrian gynaecologists
Scientists from Vienna